The royal arms of England are the arms first adopted in a fixed form at the start of the age of heraldry (circa 1200) as personal arms by the Plantagenet kings who ruled England from 1154. In the popular mind they have come to symbolise the nation of England, although according to heraldic usage nations do not bear arms, only persons and corporations do (however in Western Europe, especially in today's France, arms can be territorial civil emblems). The blazon of the arms of Plantagenet is: Gules, three lions passant guardant in pale or armed and langued azure, signifying three identical gold lions (also known as leopards) with blue tongues and claws, walking past but facing the observer, arranged in a column on a red background. Although the tincture azure of tongue and claws is not cited in many blazons, they are historically a distinguishing feature of the arms of England. This coat, designed in the High Middle Ages, has been variously combined with those of the Kings of France, Scotland, a symbol of Ireland, the House of Nassau and  the Kingdom of Hanover, according to dynastic and other political changes occurring in England, but has not altered since it took a fixed form in the reign of Richard I of England (1189–1199), the second Plantagenet king.

Although in England the official blazon refers to lions, French heralds historically used the term leopard to represent the lion passant guardant, and hence the lions of England are often called leopards. Without doubt the same animal was intended, but different names were given according to the animal's pose; in later times the name lion was given to both.

Royal emblems depicting lions were first used by Danish Vikings, Saxons (Lions were adopted in Germanic tradition around the 5th century, they were re-interpreted in a  Christian context in the western kingdoms of Gaul and Northern Italy in the 6th and 7th centuries) and Normans. Later, with Plantagenets a formal and consistent English heraldry system emerged at the end of the 12th century. The earliest surviving representation of an escutcheon, or shield, displaying three lions is that on the Great Seal of King Richard I (1189–1199), which initially displayed one or two lions rampant, but in 1198 was permanently altered to depict three lions passant, perhaps representing Richard I's principal three positions as King of the English, Duke of Normandy, and Duke of Aquitaine. In 1340, Edward III of England laid claim to the throne of France, and thus adopted the national emblem of France which he quartered with his paternal arms, the royal arms of England. He placed the French arms in the 1st and 4th quarters. This quartering was adjusted, abandoned and restored intermittently throughout the Middle Ages as the relationship between England and France changed. When the French king altered his arms from semée of fleur-de-lys, to only three, the English quartering eventually followed suit. After the Union of the Crowns in 1603, when the Kingdom of England and the Kingdom of Scotland entered a personal union, the arms of England and Scotland were marshalled (combined) in what has now become the royal coat of arms of the United Kingdom. It appears in a similar capacity to represent England in the arms of Canada and on the Late Queen's Personal Canadian Flag. The coat of three lions continues to represent England on several coins of the pound sterling, forms the basis of several emblems of English national sports teams (although with altered tinctures) and endures as one of the most recognisable national symbols of England.

When the royal arms take the form of an heraldic flag, it is variously known as the Royal Banner of England, the Banner of the Royal Arms, the Banner of the King (Queen) of England, or by the misnomer the Royal Standard of England. This royal banner differs from England's national flag, the St George's Cross, in that it does not represent any particular area or land, but rather symbolises the sovereignty vested in the rulers thereof.

History

Origins 

The first documented use of royal arms dates from the reign of Richard I (1189–1199).  Much later antiquarians would retrospectively invent attributed arms for earlier kings, but their reigns pre-dated the systematisation of hereditary English heraldry that only occurred in the second half of the 12th century.  Lions may have been used as a badge by members of the Norman dynasty: a late-12th century chronicler reports that in 1128, Henry I of England knighted his son-in-law, Geoffrey Plantagenet, Count of Anjou, and gave him a gold lion badge.  The memorial enamel created to decorate Geoffrey's tomb depicts a blue coat of arms bearing gold lions.  His youngest son, William FitzEmpress, used an equestrian seal showing a coat with a single lion rampant, while the eldest son, Henry II (1133–1189) used a lion as his emblem, and based on the arms used by his sons and other relatives, he may have used a coat of arms with a single lion or two lions, though no direct testimony of this has been found. His children experimented with different combinations of lions on their arms. Richard I (1189–1199) used a single lion rampant, or perhaps two lions affrontés, on his first Great Seal of England, but later used three lions passant in his 1198 Great Seal. The arms bear a striking resemblance to the family arms of the Hohenstaufen Emperors adopted at nearly the same time, which Richard would have been acquainted with from his travels, and would show his personal alliance with them. Richard's brother John had used a seal during the reigns of his father and elder brother that showed two lions passant, but his adoption of his brother's three-lion arms on his succession established this as the lasting design of the royal arms of England.

Development 

In 1340, following the extinction of the House of Capet, Edward III claimed the French throne. In addition to initiating the Hundred Years' War, Edward III expressed his claim in heraldic form by quartering the royal arms of England with the arms of France. This quartering continued until 1801, with intervals in 1360–1369 and 1420–1422.

Following the death of Elizabeth I in 1603, the throne of England was inherited by the Scottish House of Stuart, resulting in the Union of the Crowns: the Kingdom of England and Kingdom of Scotland were united in a personal union under James VI and I. As a consequence, the royal arms of England and Scotland were combined in the king's new personal arms. Nevertheless, although referencing the personal union with Scotland and Ireland, the royal arms of England remained distinct from the royal arms of Scotland, until the two realms were joined in a political union in 1707, leading to a unified royal coat of arms of the United Kingdom.

Union with Scotland and Ireland 

On 1 May 1707, the kingdoms of England and Scotland were merged to form that of Great Britain; this was reflected by impaling their arms in a single quarter. The claim to the French throne continued, albeit passively, until it was mooted by the French Revolution and the formation of the French First Republic in 1792. During the peace negotiations at the Conference of Lille, from July to November 1797, the French delegates demanded that the King of Great Britain abandon the title of King of France as a condition of peace. The Acts of Union 1800 united the Kingdom of Great Britain with the Kingdom of Ireland to form the United Kingdom of Great Britain and Ireland. Under King George III of the United Kingdom, a proclamation of 1 January 1801 set the royal style and titles and modified the royal arms, removing the French quarter and putting the arms of England, Scotland and Ireland on the same structural level, with the dynastic arms of Hanover moved to an inescutcheon.

Contemporary 

English heraldry flourished as a working art up to around the 17th century, when it assumed a mainly ceremonial role. The royal arms of England continued to embody information relating to English history. Although the Acts of Union 1707 placed England within the Kingdom of Great Britain, prompting new, British royal arms, the royal arms of England are still used occasionally in an official capacity, and has continued to endure as one of the national symbols of England, and has a variety of active uses. For instance, the coats of arms of both The Football Association and the England and Wales Cricket Board have a design featuring three lions passant, based on the historic royal arms of England. In 1997 (and again in 2002), the Royal Mint issued a British one pound (£1) coin featuring three lions passant to represent England. To celebrate St George's Day, in 2001, Royal Mail issued first– and second-class postage stamps with the royal crest of England (a crowned lion), and the royal arms of England (three lions passant) respectively.

Crest, supporters and other parts of the achievement 
Various accessories to the escutcheon (shield) were added and modified by successive English monarchs. These included a crest (with mantling, helm and crown); supporters (with a compartment); a motto; and the insignia of an order of knighthood. These various components made up the full achievement of arms.

Royal crest 

The first addition to the shield was in the form of a crest borne above the shield. It was during the reign of Edward III that the crest began to be widely used in English heraldry. The first representation of a royal crest was in Edward's third Great Seal, which showed a helm above the arms, and thereon a gold lion passant guardant standing upon a chapeau, and bearing a royal crown on its head. The design underwent minor variations until it took on its present form in the reign of Henry VIII: "The Royal Crown proper, thereon a lion statant guardant Or, royally crowned also proper".

The exact form of crown used in the crest varied over time. Until the reign of Henry VI it was usually shown as an open circlet adorned with fleurs-de-lys or stylised leaves. On Henry's first seal for foreign affairs the design was altered with the circlet decorated by alternating crosses formy and fleurs-de-lys. From the reign of Edward IV the crown bore a single arch, altered to a double arch by Henry VII. The design varied in details until the late 17th century, but since that time has consisted of a jewelled circlet, above which are alternating crosses formy and fleurs-de-lys. From this spring two arches decorated with pearls, and at their intersection an orb surmounted by a cross formy. A cap of crimson velvet is shown within the crown, with the cap's ermine lining appearing at the base of the crown in lieu of a torse. The shape of the arches of the crown has been represented differently at different times, and can help to date a depiction of the crest.

The helm on which the crest was borne was originally a simple steel design, sometimes with gold embellishments. In the reign of Elizabeth I a pattern of helm unique to the royal arms was introduced. This is a gold helm with a barred visor, facing the viewer. The decorative mantling (a stylised cloth cloak that hangs from the helm) was originally of red cloth lined with ermine, but was altered to cloth of gold lined ermine by Elizabeth.

Supporters

Animal supporters, standing on either side of the shield to hold and guard it, first appeared in English heraldry in the 15th century. Originally, they were not regarded as an integral part of arms, and were subject to frequent change. Various animals were sporadically shown supporting the royal arms of England, but it was only with the reign of Edward IV that their use became consistent. Supporters fell under the regulation of the Kings of Arms in the Tudor period. The heralds of that time also prochronistically created supporters for earlier monarchs, and although these attributed supporters were never used by the monarchs concerned, they were later used to signify them on public buildings or monuments completed after their deaths, for instance at St. George's Chapel, in Windsor Castle.

The boar adopted by Richard III prompted William Collingbourne's quip "The Rat, the Cat, and Lovell the Dog, Rule all England under the Hog", and William Shakespeare's derision in Richard III. The red dragon, a symbol of the Tudor dynasty, was added upon the accession of Henry VII, and used by Henry VIII and Elizabeth I. After the Union of the Crowns, the supporters of the arms of the British monarch became—and have remained—the Lion and the Unicorn, representing England and Scotland respectively.

Garter and motto

Edward III founded the Order of the Garter in about 1348. Since then, the full achievement of the royal arms has included a representation of the Garter, encircling the shield. This is a blue circlet with gold buckle and edging, bearing the order's Old French motto Honi soit qui mal y pense ("Shame be to him who thinks evil of it") in gold capital letters.

A motto, placed on a scroll below the royal arms of England, seems to have first been adopted by Henry IV in the early 15th century. His motto was Souverayne ("sovereign"). His son, Henry V adopted the motto Dieu et mon droit ("God and my right"). While this motto has been exclusively used since the accession of George I in 1714, and continues to form part of the royal arms of the United Kingdom, other mottoes were used by certain monarchs in the intervening period. Veritas temporis filia ("truth is the daughter of time") was the motto of Mary I (1553–1558), Semper Eadem ("always the same") was used by Elizabeth I (1558–1603) and Anne (1702–1714), James I (1603–1625) sometimes used Beati pacifici ("blessed are the peacemakers"), while William III (1689–1702) used the motto of the House of Orange: Je maintiendrai ("I will maintain").

Royal banner of England

The royal banner of England is the English banner of arms and so has always borne the royal arms of England—the personal arms of England's reigning monarch. When displayed in war or battle, this banner signalled that the sovereign was present in person. Because the royal banner depicted the royal arms of England, its design and composition changed throughout the Middle Ages. It is variously known as the royal banner of England, the banner of the royal arms, the banner of the king of England, or by the misnomer of the royal standard of England; Arthur Charles Fox-Davies explains that it is "a misnomer to term the banner of the royal arms the Royal Standard", because "the term standard properly refers to the long tapering flag used in battle, by which an overlord mustered his retainers in battle". The archaeologist and antiquarian Charles Boutell also makes this distinction. This royal banner differs from England's national flag, St George's Cross, in that it does not represent any particular area or land, but rather symbolises the sovereignty vested in the rulers thereof.

In other banners

Other bearers of the Royal Arms of England outside of the Royal Family

Several families depicted below here and officially entitled to bear the Lions of England, either through descent through the male line (illegitimate), or through the female line (e.g. the Dukes of Norfolk and their descendants).  

The House of Hanover stopped bearing the arms of England, and the United Kingdom, when they succeeded as Dukes of Brunswick in the German Empire.  The Duke of Brunswick was generally understood to have lost the right to bear the Royal Arms of the United Kingdom under the Titles Deprivation Act 1917, under which they also lost their British Royal Duchy, the Dukedom of Cumberland and Teviotdale as well as their place in the line of succession to the British throne.  However, after being deposed/abdicating in 1918 with the rest of the German princes, they resumed using the arms of the Kingdom of Hanover, which included the Arms of the United Kingdom.  Their right to do so is not undisputed.  However, as they reside outside the United Kingdom, there is no generally accepted international legal recourse.

The Dukes of Saxe-Coburg and Gotha are a similar situation, having been also been deprived of their British tile, Duke of Albany, and place in the succession in 1917.

Other roles and manifestations

Several ancient English towns displayed the royal arms of England upon their seals and, when it occurred to them to adopt insignia of their own, used the royal arms, albeit with modification, as their inspiration. For instance, in the arms of New Romney, the field is changed from red to blue. Hereford changes the lions from gold to silver, and in the 17th century was granted a blue border charged with silver saltires in allusion to its siege by a Scottish army during the English Civil War. The town council of Faversham changes only the hindquarters of the three lions to silver. Berkshire County Council bore arms with two golden lions in reference to its royal patronage and the Norman kings' influence upon the early history of Berkshire.

The royal arms of England features on the tabard, the distinctive traditional garment of English officers of arms. These garments were worn by heralds when performing their original duties—making royal or state proclamations and announcing tournaments. Since 1484 they have been part of the Royal Household. Tabards featuring the royal arms continue to be worn at several traditional ceremonies, such as the annual procession and service of the Order of the Garter at Windsor Castle, the State Opening of Parliament at the Palace of Westminster, the coronation of the British monarch at Westminster Abbey, and state funerals in the United Kingdom.

The Royal Standard of the United Kingdom is used in Imperial College London's coat of arms depicting the close historic link of the university with the Royal Family. The university was born out of Queen Victoria and Prince Consort Albert vision of an area of culture and science in London, now called Albertopolis.  King Edward VII granted the college the arms in 1908 by royal warrant.

See also

Royal badges of England
Royal coat of arms of Scotland
Royal coat of arms of the United Kingdom
Royal coat of arms of France
Coat of arms of Spain
Royal of arms of León
Royal arms of Castile
Coat of arms of the Crown of Aragon
Coat of arms of Norway
List of coats of arms of the House of Plantagenet

Notes

References

Citations

Sources 

 
 
 
 
 
 
 
 
 
 
 
 
 
 
 
 
 
 

Coats of arms of former countries
English coats of arms
National symbols of England
English heraldry
Flags of England
Coats of arms with lions
Royal arms of European monarchs